Los Altos School District (LASD) serves the elementary and intermediate educational needs of Los Altos, Los Altos Hills, Mountain View and Palo Alto, United States. The superintendent is Sandra McGonagle, and the Assistant Superintendent is Carrie Bosco.

History
The desire of the local residents to have a free public education for their children led to the formation of the Los Altos School District in February 1909. During this time,  of land along San Antonio Road was purchased and the construction of the first school in the region, San Antonio School, was built. It catered to students in grades K through 8, and was the only academic institution until the ending of World War II.

In the years 1948 through 1961, the city was faced with an increasing student population and state mandates against having single schools with greater than 800 students. In 1948, the district annexed lands and purchased the old Purissima School site (in Los Altos Hills) from the neighboring Palo Alto School District. During this time of expansion, the district included sixteen different schools.

Enrollment peaked in 1966, then slowly declined. The original San Antonio School was demolished and sold, while the number of facilities dwindled. The district currently consists of nine open regular schools, comprising seven elementary and two intermediate schools.

API Scores
Los Altos School District students' test scores were among the highest in California, with an average Academic Performance Index (API) score of 966 for elementary schools and 975 for intermediate schools in 2011.

Los Altos School District consistently scores high on the state examinations; four elementary schools place in the top twenty-five in the state, while both Egan and Blach score within the top fifteen middle schools. Although this success can be partially contributed to favorable demographics, the San Jose Mercury News states that "Los Altos elementary schools do well even against schools with similar demographics".

API Scores 2005-2013

*School opened

Intermediate schools (7-8)

Georgina P. Blach Intermediate School 
Blach Intermediate School is located at 1120 Covington Rd., Los Altos, CA 94024. The school mascot is the falcon.

The 2018–19 school year had 499 students in attendance. The student population was 54% male and 46% female. Its racial makeup was 50% White, 32% Asian, 12% Two or More Races and 5% Hispanic.

Blach was founded in 1957. It was honored as a California Distinguished School in 1990 and 1992, and as a National Blue Ribbon School in 2014.

Ardis G. Egan Junior High School 

Egan Junior High School is located at 100 West Portola Ave, Los Altos, CA 94022. The school mascot is the Viking.

The 2018–19 school year had 585 students in attendance. The student population was 51% male and 49% female. Its racial makeup was 45% White, 35% Asian, 10% Two or More Races and 10% Hispanic.

Egan was founded in 1957. In 1988, 1990, and 2009, Egan was chosen as a California Distinguished School, and it was honored as a National Blue Ribbon School in 2014. From 1999 to 2002, Egan was ranked as the top junior high school in the state, based on its performance on the Academic Performance Index (API) Growth Reports.

Elementary schools (K-6)
Almond Elementary School
Gardner Bullis Elementary School
Covington Elementary School
Loyola Elementary School
Oak Avenue Elementary School
Santa Rita Elementary School
Springer Elementary School

Bullis Charter School is not chartered by LASD, but through the Santa Clara County Office of Education. LASD provides facilities to Bullis Charter School in accordance with California law.

Charter school lawsuits

The District has been sued several times by Bullis Charter School (BCS). After winning two lawsuits, the District lost a case in the appellate court of California. The court found the District to have violated Proposition 39 in regard to providing "reasonably equivalent" facilities for BCS and was cited for having undercounted by over 1,000,000 square feet. BCS was founded as a reaction to the LASD board's decision on 10 February 2003 to close Bullis-Purissima Elementary School and has been at odds with LASD administration since the school's inception.

Bullis Charter School and LASD currently have come to a 5-year "cease-fire" agreement over facilities.

References

External links
 
 List of Schools in LASD from the API database

School districts in Santa Clara County, California
Los Altos, California
Mountain View, California
Organizations based in Palo Alto, California
School districts established in 1909
1909 establishments in California